Pihuamo is a town and municipality located in the state of Jalisco in Mexico.

History
Pihuamo is a municipality located in the southeast region of the state of Jalisco. At one time this region belonged to another town in Jalisco known as Tzapotlán. The occupants of this town have had various origins: toltecas, zapotecas and purépechas. The purépechas arrived to that region in 1480, and they dominated the town of Tzapotlán for some years, but before the Spanish conquest they were defeated by the indigenous of Zapotlán, Zacoalco, Sayula, and Colima in the Saltpeter War (1480-1510) (Guerra del Salitre).

This territory was discovered and conquered by the Captain Cristóbal de Olid with the aid of Juan Rodríguez de Villafuerte in early 1522 when they were sent there by Hernán Cortés to explore the western region of what is today known as Jalisco. 
In 1598 the town of Santiago of Pivámoc was on the bank of a river, in a valley between the high hills. It was inhabited by seven married aborigines. They spoke the Mexican language and the popoloca language. They lived in Tuxpan. Xilollancini was a little town that was in a deep valley; however Xilollancini was destroyed by a heavy rain that lasted various hours and it divided La Cajita hill. Today, this town is called Pueblo Viejo. This incident caused Xilollancini to be changed from its old location to its current location called Las Lomas. This place belonged to a man named Pío, who his workers called "owner", and with the time these 2 words were converted into the current name of this town: Pihuamo.
During Mexico's Independence from Spain 1810–1821, the parroquial files were burned. Antonio Cañas escaped because frequently, in the church, he gave the orders to the insurgent movement.  
In 1825 he was in the town hall because at that time the town was controlled by the army, the "4º Cantón de Sayula" and in 1890 the town was controlled by other army, the name of that army was the "9º Cantón de Ciudad Guzmán". 
In the development of Pihuamo, there isn't information about the history of this municipality between 1825 and 1890.
In April 1891 this place became a municipality, and the territorial limits were established. This was under the 472 decree on 29 April of the sale year.
The 7341 decree published on 27 January 1959 granted the title of "Villa".
In Pihuamo, Dr. Atl presented the chimerical city of the Universal Culture with the name of "Olinka". Olinka is a náhuatl word and it means place where movement is generated. The objective of Olinka was that artists and intellectual people could live there.

Government

Municipal presidents

References

Pihuamo, Jalisco, México
Pihuamo, jalisco Mexico Página Oficial

Municipalities of Jalisco